Nabeul Governorate is one of the 24 governorates of Tunisia. It is situated in north-eastern Tunisia. It covers an area of 2,788 km2 and has a population of 787,920 (2014 census). The capital is Nabeul.

Nabeul Governorate forms a peninsula which is surrounded by the Mediterranean Sea on three sides, excepting only the south-west side where it is delimited by the three governorates of Zaghouan, Sousse and Ben Arous.

History
Nabeul, the main city of the governorate, was founded in the 5th century BC by the Greeks of Cyrene, serving as a trade port. Its name is an Arabised form of the Greek Neapolis 'new city' (an etymology it shares with Naples, Neapoli, and Nablus).

Administrative divisions
The governorate is divided into sixteen delegations (mutamadiyat), listed below with their populations at the 2004 and 2014 Censuses:

Municipalities

There are 24 municipalities (communes) within the Nabeul Governorate:

Climate 
Nabeul has an arid climate with steppe precipitation and hot arid temperature.

References

 
Governorates of Tunisia